Jón Margeir Sverrisson (born 22 November 1992) is a Paralympic swimmer from Iceland, competing in the S14 disability category in freestyle and breaststroke. He represented Iceland at the 2012 Summer Paralympics in London, winning the gold medal in the Men's 200m freestyle (S14).

References

1992 births
Living people
Jon Margeir Sverrisson
Jon Margeir Sverrisson
Jon Margeir Sverrisson
Swimmers at the 2012 Summer Paralympics
Jon Margeir Sverrisson
Medalists at the 2012 Summer Paralympics
Icelandic male freestyle swimmers
S14-classified Paralympic swimmers
Paralympic medalists in swimming